Castoreum is a genus of truffle-like fungi in the Mesophelliaceae family. The genus, circumscribed by English mycologists Mordecai Cubitt Cooke and George Edward Massee in 1887, contains three species found in Australia.

References

External links
 

Hysterangiales
Truffles (fungi)
Agaricomycetes genera